Princess Claire may refer to two people:

 Princess Claire of Belgium (born 1974)
 Princess Claire of Luxembourg (born 1985)